Gronovi's dwarf burrowing skink (Scelotes gronovii) is a species of skink, a lizard in the family Scincidae. The species is endemic to South Africa.

Etymology
Both the specific name, gronovii, and the common name are in honor of Dutch naturalist Laurens Theodorus Gronovius.

Description
S. gronovii has no front legs, and each back leg has only one toe.

Reproduction
S. gronovii is viviparous.

References

Further reading
Branch, Bill (2004). Field Guide to Snakes and other Reptiles of Southern Africa. Third Revised edition, Second Impression. Sanibel Island, Florida: Ralph Curtis Books. 399 pp. . (Scelotes gronovii, p. 142 + Plate 47).
Daudin FM (1802). Histoire Naturelle, Générale et Particulière des Reptiles; Ouvrage faisant suite à l'Histoire Naturelle générale et particulière, composée par Leclerc de Buffon; et rédigée par C.S. Sonnini, membre de plusiers sociétés savantes. Tome quatrième. Paris: F. Dufart. 397 pp. (Seps gronovii, pp. 354–358). (in French and Latin).

Scelotes
Endemic reptiles of South Africa
Reptiles described in 1802
Taxa named by François Marie Daudin
Taxonomy articles created by Polbot